The 1974 United States Senate election in Louisiana was held on November 5, 1974.  Incumbent Democratic Senator Russell Long was elected to a sixth term in office.

On August 17, Long won the Democratic primary with 74.75% of the vote. At this time, Louisiana was a one-party state and the Democratic nomination was tantamount to victory. Long won the November general election without an opponent.

Democratic primary

Candidates
Sherman A. Bernard, Louisiana Commissioner of Insurance
Russell Long, incumbent Senator
Annie Smart

Results

General election

References

1974
Louisiana
United States Senate
Single-candidate elections